East Kent (formally known as "Kent, Eastern") was a county constituency in Kent in South East England.  It returned two Members of Parliament (MPs) to the House of Commons of the Parliament of the United Kingdom, elected by the first past the post system.

History

The constituency was created by the Reform Act 1832 for the 1832 general election, and abolished by the Redistribution of Seats Act 1885 for the 1885 general election.

All three two-member constituencies in Kent were abolished in 1885: East Kent, Mid Kent and West Kent.  They were replaced by eight new single-member constituencies:
Ashford
Dartford
Faversham
Isle of Thanet
Medway
St Augustine's
Sevenoaks
Tunbridge.

Boundaries
1832–1885: The Lathes of St. Augustine and Shepway (including the Liberty of Romney Marsh), and the Upper Division of the Lathe of Scray.

Members of Parliament 

Notes

Election results

Elections in the 1830s

Elections in the 1840s

 
 

Knatchbull was appointed Paymaster General, causing a by-election.

 

Knatchbull resigned by accepting the office of Steward of the Chiltern Hundreds, causing a by-election.

Elections in the 1850s
Plumptre resigned, causing a by-election.

 
 

 
 

 

 
 
 

 

 

Dering resigned due to ill health, causing a by-election.

Elections in the 1860s
Deedes' death caused a by-election.

 
 

 

 

 

Bridges was elevated to the peerage, becoming Lord FitzWalter and causing a by-election.

Elections in the 1870s

 

 

Milles succeeded to the peerage, becoming Lord Sondes.

Knatchbull resigned, causing a by-election.

Elections in the 1880s

References 

Parliamentary constituencies in Kent (historic)
Constituencies of the Parliament of the United Kingdom established in 1832
Constituencies of the Parliament of the United Kingdom disestablished in 1885